The Women's Islamic Games were an international multi-sport event started in 1993. The event was organised by the Islamic Federation of Women's Sport (IFWS). Muslim women of all nationalities were allowed to take part in the Games.

The event has been held in 1993, 1997, 2001, and 2005 in Iran.

Goals
In sports and international competition, Muslim women cannot compete without protective clothing and headgear in accordance with Islam.
Inspire Muslim women to achieve global competitiveness, on a regional, continental, world and Olympic scale.
The Women's Islamic Games will be an international event, and records shall be kept of athletes' performances.

Editions

Medal count
25 nations have won at least a single medal in the Women's Islamic Games. 23 nations have won at least a single gold medal. Iran became till now the leadership of the most winning medals.

See also

Islamic Solidarity Games
Islamic Games

References

External links
Official Web Site of Women's Islamic Games

 
Defunct multi-sport events
Islam and women
Women's sports competitions
Recurring sporting events established in 1993
1993 establishments in Iran
Recurring sporting events disestablished in 2005
2005 disestablishments in Iran